Gabriela "Gabi" Kasper Barbieri (born 7 March 2003) is a Brazilian professional footballer who plays as a goalkeeper for Internacional.

Club career
Barbieri was born in Descanso, Santa Catarina, and began her career with Chapecoense in 2017. In 2019, she moved to Internacional, being initially assigned to the under-18 team.

Promoted to the first team in 2021, Barbieri was initially a third-choice behind Vivi Holzel and Mayara, before becoming a backup option in the 2022 season. On 10 November 2022, she renewed with Inter for a further year.

International career
Barbieri represented Brazil at under-20 level in the 2022 South American Under-20 Women's Football Championship and the 2022 FIFA U-20 Women's World Cup, winning the former. On 19 June of that year, prior to the U-20 World Cup, she was called up to the full side by manager Pia Sundhage for friendlies against Denmark and Sweden; she was an unused substitute in both matches.

Honours

Club
Internacional
: 2021

International
Brazil U20
South American Under-20 Women's Football Championship: 2022

References

2003 births
Living people
Sportspeople from Santa Catarina (state)
Brazilian women's footballers
Women's association football goalkeepers
Campeonato Brasileiro de Futebol Feminino Série A1 players
Sport Club Internacional (women) players